The Artchive is a virtual art gallery website. It was established in the late 1990s by Mark Harden. He contributed to WebMuseum from 1995 before establishing the Artchive. A biography of the founder called it a "top art resource". A user on Pinterest called it "such a valuable website". However, the contact email does not currently work and the site is neglected and not updated.

The Artchive website displays historic artworks with a convenient viewer that allows the size of the image to be set easily as required. It provides a leading online teaching resource for art at a university level.

The Artchive contains 2,300 scans of works by more than 200 artists. Posters of displayed artworks are available.

It has the same name as a service of SITO.

Notable works on the site include The Fight Between Carnival and Lent by Pieter Bruegel the Elder.

See also
 Web Gallery of Art
 WebMuseum

References

External links
 The Artchive

Virtual art museums and galleries
Art websites
Tertiary educational websites